Ramchandra Martand Hajarnavis (24 February 1908 – 27 December 1976) was an Indian lawyer and politician.

Early life
He studied at Morris College and Law College Nagpur and practiced at Bar. He was President of Bidi Kamgar Sangh during 1941–44.

Political career
Hajarnavis started his political career as a councillor in the Corporation of the City of Nagpur in 1955. In 1957 he turned his attention to the national stage and was elected to the Second Lok Sabha as the member for Bhandara (Lok Sabha constituency). He was re-elected to the 3rd Lok Sabha from Bhandara in 1962. With the split of the Bhandara constituency prior to the 1962 election, he stood for election from Chimur (Lok Sabha constituency) and continued as a member of the 4th Lok Sabha.

He served in various roles in the 4th Nehru Ministry, the Shastri Ministry and in both Nanda Ministries.

He retired from politics prior to the 1971 Lok Sabha election and returned to working as an advocate.

Personal life
He married Usha (Kamal Gupte) in 1941 and had 2 sons. He is the father of mathematician Professor Charudatta Ramchandra Hajarnavis and a cousin of astrophysicist Professor Shashikumar Chitre

Publication
The law of agricultural tenancy and village service lands in the Central provinces (a commentary on the C.P. Tenancy act, Act 1 of 1920), Nagpur, B.G. Gargay [1948]

References

1908 births
1976 deaths
People from Bhandara
India MPs 1957–1962
People from Chandrapur
India MPs 1962–1967
India MPs 1967–1970
Politicians from Nagpur
Maharashtra municipal councillors
People from Pune
Indian National Congress politicians from Maharashtra